Ta'Shia Phillips (born January 24, 1989) is a professional basketball player who most recently played for the New York Liberty of the Women's National Basketball Association.

Xavier statistics

Source

USA Basketball
Phillips was named a member of the team representing the US at the 2009 World University Games held in Belgrade, Serbia. The team won all seven games to earn the gold medal. Phillips averaged 4.9 points per game.

WNBA
Phillips was selected the first round of the 2011 WNBA Draft (8th overall) by the Atlanta Dream.

References

1989 births
Living people
All-American college women's basketball players
American women's basketball players
Atlanta Dream draft picks
Basketball players from Indianapolis
Centers (basketball)
New York Liberty players
Parade High School All-Americans (girls' basketball)
Universiade gold medalists for the United States
Universiade medalists in basketball
Xavier Musketeers women's basketball players
Washington Mystics players
Medalists at the 2009 Summer Universiade